Terminal punctuation refers to the punctuation marks used to identify the end of a portion of text. Terminal punctuation marks are also referred to as end marks and stops.

In languages using the ISO basic Latin alphabet, terminal punctuation marks are defined as the period, the question mark, and the exclamation mark. These punctuation marks may bring sentences to a close. In their widest sense, terminal punctuation marks bring any element of written text to a close, including other conventions, such as abbreviations.

See also 
Sentence spacing

Notes

References 

Punctuation
Typographical symbols